Parliamentary elections were held in the Grand Duchy of Finland on 1 and 3 May 1909.

Results

References

General elections in Finland
Finland
Parliamentary
Finland
Election and referendum articles with incomplete results